Héctor Martínez Muñoz (December 14, 1924 – November 14, 1991) was the first member of the Supreme Court of Puerto Rico appointed by Governor Luis A. Ferré and confirmed by an opposition-controlled Senate of Puerto Rico presided by Rafael Hernández Colón.

Born on in San Juan, Puerto Rico, Martínez obtained a B.A. from Virginia State University and a law degree in 1951 from the University of Puerto Rico School of Law.  During twenty years he practiced law in the private sector but served ad honorem on the State Board of Education, as a Bar examiner and on the Legislative Committee of the Puerto Rico Bar Association.

In 1971, Gov. Ferré, after withdrawing two nominations that the opposition-led Senate was going to reject, appointed Martínez as Associate Justice. Negotiations with the Senate led to his confirmation,  assuming his post on the bench on June 12, 1971.  After Luis Negrón Fernández resigned on September 15, 1972 after a second stint as Chief Justice, Ferré nominated Martínez for Chief Justice but the Popular Democratic Party of Puerto Rico majority in the Senate rejected his elevation to the court's top post.  Less than a year later, Martínez resigned from the bench and returned to private practice.

In the late 1970s, Governor Carlos Romero Barceló appointed him to several ad honorem posts, including the Governor's Judicial Nominations Advisory Committee and the Puerto Rico Council on Higher Education.

Justice Héctor Martínez Muñoz died in San Juan at the age of 66.

Sources 

La Justicia en sus Manos by Luis Rafael Rivera, 

Associate Justices of the Supreme Court of Puerto Rico
Puerto Rican lawyers
Virginia State University alumni
1924 births
1991 deaths
20th-century American lawyers
20th-century American judges